Christopher Stuart Henshilwood is a South African archaeologist. He has been Professor of African Archeology at the University of Bergen since 2007 and, since 2008, Professor at the Chair of "The Origins of Modern Human Behavior" at the University of the Witwatersrand. Henshilwood became internationally known due to his excavations in the Blombos Cave, where - according to his study published in 2002 - the oldest known works of humanity had been discovered. Henshilwood and his work have been featured on National Geographic and CNN Inside Africa.

Education and career 
Henshilwood completed his BA (with distinction in Archaeology) from the University of Cape Town (UCT) in 1989, BA.Hons (with distinction) from UCT in 1990 and PhD (Archaeology) from the University of Cambridge in 1995, with a thesis entitled "Holocene archaeology of the coastal Garcia State Forest, southern Cape, South Africa". He completed a postdoctoral research fellowship at UCT from 1996 to 1997.

He was awarded  research funding from the Anglo American Chairman's Fund from 1998 to 2001 for research on “Modern Human Origins”. During this time and until 2004 he worked as an adjunct associate professor at the department of anthropology, State University of New York, Stony Brook. From there in 2002 he moved to the University of Bergen in Norway where he was appointed as a professor at the Centre for Development Studies in the Department of Archaeology. Concurrently he acted as research member at the University of Bordeaux, France for the programme "Origine de l'Homme, du langage et des langue" (The origin of man, speech and language).

He currently leads the Center of Excellence SAPIENce at the University of Bergen. The center researches early human behavior and includes a team of multidisciplinary scholars, including paleoclimatologists Nele Meckler and Eystein Jansen and psychologists Andrea Bender and Kenneth Hugdahl.

Awards and recognition 
In 2014 he was ranked in the top 10 of South Africa’s most influential scientific minds for the period 2002–2012 by the South African Journal of Science
In 2002 Henshilwood was invited to the opening of the Parliament of South Africa in Cape Town and was mentioned by President Thabo Mbeki in his State of the Nation address.
In 2000, Nelson Mandela became a patron of the Blombos project, at the request of Henshilwood.
National Geographic has featured aspects of his work at Blombos cave on three occasions.

Television appearances 

2010 – NHK Japanese Broadcasting Corporation: Film for TV made with Henshilwood at Blombos Cave 
2010 – Film made at Cape Point Nature Reserve with Henshilwood on the 'Origins of H. sapiens' for Foster Brother Film Productions, South Africa.
2009 – TV film made with Henshilwood at Blombos Cave for the Swedish Broadcasting Society Directed by Martin Widman and presented by Lasse Berg
2008 – Film made at Blombos Cave with Henshilwood in March, 2008 for display in the ‘Anne & Bernard Spitzer Hall of Human Origins’, American Museum of Natural History, New York. 
2008 – Film made at De Hoop Nature Reserve with Henshilwood directed by Alan Wilcox on Human Evolution in Africa. SABC Production.

Selected publications
 Henshilwood, CS et al. (2002). "Emergence of modern human behavior: Middle Stone Age engravings from South Africa". Science. 295 (5558): 1278-1280.

See also
 Blombos Cave

References

External links
 
 
 
 Profile of Christopher Henshilwood at Mendeley
 Staff Profile at WITS University archived at The Wayback Machine
 Early Southern Sapiens (SapienCE) on Facebook
 Anglo American Chairman's Fund

Year of birth missing (living people)
Living people
South African archaeologists
Academic staff of the University of the Witwatersrand
Alumni of the University of Cambridge
University of Cape Town alumni
South African scientists
European Research Council grantees
Academic staff of the University of Bergen